This is a list of people who have served as Lord-Lieutenant of Cavan. 

There were lieutenants of counties in Ireland until the reign of James II, when they were renamed governors. The office of Lord Lieutenant was recreated on 23 August 1831, and is pronounced as 'Lord Lef-tenant'. The Lord Lieutenant also acted as Custos Rotulorum for the county.

Governors

 The 1st Earl of Bellomont
 The 2nd Earl of Farnham
 The 5th Baron Farnham: 1805–1831

Lord Lieutenants
 The 2nd Marquess of Headfort: 17 October 1831 – 6 December 1870
 The 1st Baron Lisgar: 3 April 1871 – 6 October 1876
 The 6th Earl of Lanesborough: 18 December 1876 – July 1900
 The 10th Baron Farnham: 18 July 1900 – 22 November 1900
 Colonel The Rt Hon. E.J. Saunderson, P.C., M.P.: 21 December 1900 – 21 October 1906
 The Rt Hon. Thomas Lough, P.C., M.P.: 15 March 1907 – 11 January 1922

References

Cavan
History of County Cavan
Politics of County Cavan